Blastobasis graminea is a moth in the family Blastobasidae. It is found in Colombia, Venezuela, Costa Rica, Mexico (Autlan and Veracruz) and the south-eastern United States (southern Louisiana).

The length of the forewings is 8.9–9 mm. The forewings are pale orange brown intermixed with brown scales. The hindwings are translucent pale brown.

The larvae bore the stem of Saccharum officinarum, Sorghum aethiopicum, Zea mays, Coix lacryma-jobi, Setaria paniculifera and Spartina alterniflora.

References

Moths described in 1999
Blastobasis